Ruedes is a parish of the municipality of Gijón, in Asturias, Spain.

Its population was 118 in 2012.

Located in the south area of the municipality, Ruedes borders the districts of La Pedrera, Gijón and L'Abadía Cenero in the north, and with the municipality of Siero in the south.

There was a leprosería (Leper hospital) in Ruedes during the Early modern period.

Villages and their neighbourhoods
La Figar
La Badolla
La Casa Diezmera / La Casa'l Monte
Los Coletos
El Pingón
Ruedes
La Cotariella
La Quintana

External links
 Official Toponyms - Principality of Asturias website.
 Official Toponyms: Laws - BOPA Nº 229 - Martes, 3 de octubre de 2006 & DECRETO 105/2006, de 20 de septiembre, por el que se determinan los topónimos oficiales del concejo de Gijón.

Parishes in Gijón